Eilís Veronica Ferran, FBA (born 14 March 1962) is a Northern Irish solicitor, legal scholar, and academic administrator. As an academic, she specialises in company law, financial regulation, and corporate finance. She has been Professor of Company and Securities Law at the University of Cambridge since 2005, and its Pro-Vice-Chancellor for Institutional and International Relations since 2015.

Early life and education
Ferran was born on 14 March 1962 in Belfast, Northern Ireland. She was educated at St Dominic's High School, an all-girls Catholic School in Belfast. In 1980, she matriculated into St Catharine's College, Cambridge to study law. She was the first member of her family to attend the University of Cambridge. She graduated with a first class Bachelor of Arts (BA) degree in 1983; as is the privilege of Cambridge graduates, she was able to apply for her BA to be promoted to a Master of Arts (MA Cantab) degree in 1986. In 1992, she was awarded a Doctorate of Philosophy (PhD) by the University of Cambridge by Special Regulations, that is to say through published works rather than a doctoral thesis.

Career

Legal career
From 1984 to 1986, Ferran was an articled clerk at Coward Chance (now known as Clifford Chance). She qualified as a solicitor in 1986. From September to December 2012, she was a specialist advisor to the House of Lords European Union Committee during its inquiry into banking union.

Academic career
In 1986, Ferran returned to St Catharine's College, Cambridge (her alma mater) as a lecturer in law. She was elected a Fellow of St Catharine's College in 1987. She was also an assistant lecturer from 1988 to 1991 and a lecturer from 1991 to 2000 at the Faculty of Law, University of Cambridge. She was Director of the Centre for Corporate and Commercial Law from April 1999 to September 2003, and its Co-Director from January 2006 to 2010. In 2000, the university promoted her to Reader in Corporate Law and Financial Regulation. In 2005, she was appointed Professor of Company and Securities Law; this made her the first woman to hold a professorship in Cambridge's Faculty of Law. From April 2012 to 2015, she served as the Chair of the Faculty of Law. Since 1 October 2015, she has been the Pro-Vice-Chancellor for Institutional and International Relations.

Ferran has held a number of visiting appointments. In April 2002, she was a visiting professor to the University of Hong Kong. From July to August 2004, she was a Chapman Tripp Fellow at the Victoria University of Wellington, New Zealand. From July to August 2009, she was a visiting professor at the Law Faculty of the University of Auckland, New Zealand. From July to August 2010, she was a visiting professor at Harvard Law School, United States.

Personal life
In 1992, Ferran married Roderick Cantrill, who is the Bursar of Fitzwilliam College, Cambridge. Together they have one son and one daughter.

Honours
In 2013, Ferran was elected a Fellow of the British Academy (FBA), the United Kingdom's national academy for the humanities and social sciences. On 11 November 2014, she was appointed an Honorary Bencher of the Middle Temple.

Selected works

References

1962 births
Living people
Solicitors from Northern Ireland
Legal scholars of the University of Cambridge
Fellows of St Catharine's College, Cambridge
Legal scholars from Northern Ireland
Finance law scholars
Fellows of the British Academy
Lawyers from Belfast
Alumni of St Catharine's College, Cambridge
People educated at St Dominic's Grammar School for Girls